Toxodera fimbriata, common name feathered mantis, is a species of praying mantis found in Myanmar, Malay Peninsula, Sumatra, and Borneo. This species is easily distinguished by others of the genera by their strong curved pronotum.

See also

List of mantis genera and species

References

Mantidae
Mantodea of Asia
Insects described in 1930